Revolt in 2100 is a 1953 science fiction collection by American writer Robert A. Heinlein, part of his Future History series.

The contents are as follows:
 Foreword by Henry Kuttner, "The Innocent Eye"
 "If This Goes On—" (1940; originally published in Astounding Science Fiction)
 "Coventry" (1940; originally published in Astounding Science Fiction)
 "Misfit" (1939; originally published in Astounding Science Fiction)
 Future History chart
 Afterword: "Concerning Stories Never Written"

The short novel, "If This Goes On—", describes a rebellion against an American theocracy and thus served as the vehicle for Heinlein to criticise the authoritarian potential of Protestant Christian fundamentalism. The work is not an attack on religion in general, however, as he has a Mormon community take part in the anti-theocratic revolt. Heinlein rewrote the work for this appearance.

The short stories, "Coventry" and "Misfit", describe the succeeding secular liberal society from the point of view of characters who reject it.

Later paperback editions have paired Revolt in 2100 with Methuselah's Children.

The afterword describes three stories which describe the beginning of the theocracy and subsequent beginnings of rebellion against it.  "The Sound of His Wings" would have concerned a televangelist named Nehemiah Scudder who rides a populist, racist wave of support to the Presidency. "Eclipse" describes the subsequent collapse of American society with particular emphasis on the withdrawal from space travel by the new regime. "The Stone Pillow" offers the rise of the rebellion which the protagonists of "If This Goes On—" later join; the rebellion (styled the "Second American Revolution" in later stories of the Future History) includes Mormons, Catholics, and Jews, groups suppressed by the Theocracy, working in concert with Freemasons. Internal evidence of the series, particularly conversations in Methuselah's Children and Time Enough For Love place the Scudder election in the year 2012.

The character of Nehemiah Scudder, the "First Prophet" of the regime, appeared in Heinlein's first novel (never published in his lifetime), For Us, The Living. He is also used in Spider Robinson's Variable Star, a novel based on an outline of Heinlein's. The novel borrows liberally from Heinlein's Future History, although it does not follow its timeline.

Reviewer Groff Conklin described the Shasta edition as "a classic" and the lead story as "a smashing tale of revolution in the United States." Boucher and McComas, however, described the collection as "[i]mpressive in its time, and important in the development of modern science fiction," but found it highly uneven, "with pages worthy of the mature 1954 Heinlein ... followed immediately by passages from the author's literary apprenticeship." P. Schuyler Miller found Revolt in 2100 to be "a distinctly minor Heinlein contribution, ... way below the mark Heinlein has set himself in his recent teen-age books."

See also

 Political ideas in science fiction
 Religious ideas in science fiction

References

External links
 
 

1953 short story collections
Short story collections by Robert A. Heinlein
Works originally published in Analog Science Fiction and Fact
Fiction set in the 22nd century
Religion in science fiction